Warren Everett Barry (August 4, 1933 – March 31, 2016) was an American businessman and politician.

Born in Boston, Massachusetts. He graduated from the University of Massachusetts Boston in 1954. He served in the United States Marine Corps from 1954 to 1958. Barry was a commercial industrial property manager in Springfield, Virginia. From 1970 to 1983, Barry served in the Virginia House of Delegates, until he resigned when elected Fairfax County Circuit Court Clerk. He then served in the Virginia State Senate from 1991 to 2002. Barry was a Republican.

Notes

1933 births
2016 deaths
Politicians from Boston
People from Springfield, Virginia
Military personnel from Massachusetts
University of Massachusetts Boston alumni
Businesspeople from Virginia
Republican Party members of the Virginia House of Delegates
Republican Party Virginia state senators
Businesspeople from Boston
United States Marines
20th-century American politicians
20th-century American businesspeople
21st-century American politicians